Janusz Korczak, the pen name of Henryk Goldszmit (22 July 1878 or 1879 – 7 August 1942), was a Polish Jewish educator, children's author and pedagogue known as Pan Doktor ("Mr. Doctor") or Stary Doktor ("Old Doctor"). After spending many years working as a principal of an orphanage in Warsaw, he refused sanctuary repeatedly and stayed with his orphans when the entire population of the institution was sent from the Ghetto to the Treblinka extermination camp during the Grossaktion Warschau of 1942.

Biography
Korczak was born in Warsaw in 1878. He was unsure of his birth date, which he attributed to his father's failure to promptly acquire a birth certificate for him. His parents were Józef Goldszmit, a respected lawyer from a family of proponents of the haskalah, and Cecylia née Gębicka, daughter of a prominent Kalisz family. Born to a Jewish family, he was an agnostic in his later life. He did not believe in forcing religion on children. His father fell ill around 1890 and was admitted to a mental hospital, where he died six years later on 25 April 1896. Spacious apartments were given up on Miodowa street, then Świętojerska. As his family's financial situation worsened, Henryk, while still attending the gymnasium (the current ), began to work as a tutor for other pupils. In 1896 he debuted on the literary scene with a satirical text on raising children, Węzeł gordyjski (The Gordian Knot).

In 1898, he used Janusz Korczak as a pen name in the Ignacy Jan Paderewski Literary Contest. The name originated from the book O Janaszu Korczaku i pięknej Miecznikównie by Józef Ignacy Kraszewski. In the 1890s he studied in the Flying University. During the years 1898–1904 Korczak studied medicine at the University of Warsaw and also wrote for several Polish language newspapers. After graduation, he became a pediatrician. In 1905−1912 Korczak worked at Bersohns and Baumans Children's Hospital in Warsaw. During the Russo-Japanese War, in 1905–06 he served as a military doctor. Meanwhile, his book Child of the Drawing Room (Dziecko salonu) gained him some literary recognition. 

In 1907–08, Korczak went to study in Berlin. While working for the Orphans' Society in 1909, he met Stefania Wilczyńska, his future closest associate. In 1911–1912, he became a director of Dom Sierot in Warsaw, an orphanage of his own design for Jewish children. He hired Wilczyńska as his assistant. There he formed a kind-of-a-republic for children with its own small parliament, court, and a newspaper. He reduced his other duties as a doctor. Some of his descriptions of the summer camp for Jewish children in this period and subsequently were later published in his Fragmenty Utworów and have been translated into English.

During World War I, in 1914 Korczak became a military doctor with the rank of lieutenant. He served again as a military doctor in the Polish Army with the rank of major during the Polish-Soviet War,  but after a brief stint in Łódź was assigned to Warsaw. After the wars, he continued his practice in Warsaw. Korczak was a lifelong bachelor and had no biological children of his own.

Sovereign Poland
In 1926, Korczak arranged for the children of the Dom Sierot (Orphan House) to begin their own newspaper, the Mały Przegląd (Little Review), as a weekly attachment to the daily Polish-Jewish newspaper Nasz Przegląd (Our Review). In these years, his secretary was the noted Polish novelist Igor Newerly. His orphanage was supported by the CENTOS Polish-Jewish charity.

During the 1930s, he had his own radio program where he promoted and popularized the rights of children. In 1933, he was awarded the Silver Cross of the Polonia Restituta. Between 1934–36, Korczak travelled every year to Mandate Palestine and visited its kibbutzim. Additionally, it spurred his estrangement with the non-Jewish orphanage for which he had also been working. A letter he wrote indicates that he had some intentions to move to Palestine, but in the end, he felt he couldn’t leave his children behind. He stayed in Poland, even when Wilczyńska went to live in Palestine in 1938 and continued his role as headmaster.

The Holocaust

In 1939, when World War II erupted, Korczak volunteered for duty in the Polish Army but was refused due to his age. He witnessed the Wehrmacht takeover of Warsaw. When the Germans created the Warsaw Ghetto in 1940, his orphanage was forced to move from its building, Dom Sierot at Krochmalna 92, to the Ghetto (first to Chłodna 33 and later to Sienna 16 / Śliska 9). Korczak moved in with them. In July, Janusz Korczak decided that the children in the orphanage should put on Rabindranath Tagore's play The Post Office.

On 5 or 6 August 1942, German soldiers came to collect the 192 orphans (there is some debate about the actual number: it may have been 196) and about one dozen staff members to transport them to the Treblinka extermination camp. Korczak had been offered sanctuary on the "Aryan side" by the Polish underground organization Żegota, but turned it down repeatedly, saying that he could not abandon his children. On 5 August, he again refused offers of sanctuary, insisting that he would go with the children, asserting his belief: "You do not leave a sick child in the night, and you do not leave children at a time like this".

The children were dressed in their best clothes, and each carried a blue knapsack and a favorite book or toy. Joshua Perle, an eyewitness whose wartime writings were saved in the Ringelblum Archive, described the procession of Korczak and the children through the Ghetto to the Umschlagplatz (deportation point to the death camps):

According to eyewitnesses, when the group of orphans finally reached the Umschlagplatz, an SS officer recognized Korczak as the author of one of his favorite children's books and offered to help him escape. In another version, the officer was acting officially, as the Nazi authorities had in mind some kind of "special treatment" for Korczak (some prominent Jews with international reputations were sent to Theresienstadt). Whatever the offer, Korczak once again refused. He boarded the trains with the children and was never heard from again. Korczak's evacuation from the Ghetto is also mentioned in Władysław Szpilman's book The Pianist:

Sometime after, there were rumours that the trains had been diverted and that Korczak and the children had survived. There was, however, no basis to these stories. Most likely, Korczak, along with Wilczyńska and most of the children, was murdered in a gas chamber after arriving at Treblinka. A separate account of Korczak's departure is given in Mary Berg's Warsaw Ghetto diary:

Writings
Korczak's best known writing is his fiction and pedagogy, and his most popular works have been widely translated. His main pedagogical texts have been translated into English, but of his fiction, only two of his novels have been translated into English: King Matt the First and Kaytek the Wizard.

As the date of Korczak's death was not officially established, his date of death for legal purposes was established in 1954 by a Polish court as 9 May 1946, a standard ruling for people whose death date was not documented but in all likelihood occurred during World War II. The copyright to all works by Korczak was subsequently acquired by The Polish Book Institute (Instytut Książki), a cultural institution and publishing house affiliated with the Polish government. In 2012 the Institute's rights were challenged by the Modern Poland Foundation, whose goal was to establish by court trial that Korczak died in 1942 so that Korczak's works would be available in the public domain as of 1 January 2013. The Foundation won the case in 2015 and subsequently started to digitise Korczak's works and release them as public domain e-books.

Korczak's overall literary oeuvre covers the period 1896 to 8 August 1942. It comprises works for both children and adults and includes literary pieces, social journalism, articles and pedagogical essays, together with some scraps of unpublished work, totalling over twenty books, over 1,400 texts published in around 100 publications, and around 300 texts in manuscript or typescript form. A complete edition of his works is planned for 2012.

Children's books
Korczak often employed the form of a fairy tale in order to prepare his young readers for the dilemmas and difficulties of real adult life, and the need to make responsible decisions.

In the 1923 King Matt the First (Król Maciuś Pierwszy) and its sequel King Matt on the Desert Island (Król Maciuś na wyspie bezludnej) Korczak depicted a child prince who is catapulted to the throne by the sudden death of his father, and who must learn from various mistakes:

He tries to read and answer all his mail by himself and finds that the volume is too much and he needs to rely on secretaries; he is exasperated with his ministers and has them arrested, but soon realises that he does not know enough to govern by himself, and is forced to release the ministers and institute constitutional monarchy; when a war breaks out he does not accept being shut up in his palace, but slips away and joins up, pretending to be a peasant boy - and narrowly avoids becoming a POW; he takes the offer of a friendly journalist to publish for him a "royal paper" -and finds much later that he gets carefully edited news and that the journalist is covering up the gross corruption of the young king's best friend; he tries to organise the children of all the world to hold processions and demand their rights – and ends up antagonising other kings; he falls in love with a black African princess and outrages racist opinion (by modern standards, however, Korczak's depiction of blacks is itself not completely free of stereotypes which were current at the time of writing); finally, he is overthrown by the invasion of three foreign armies and exiled to a desert island, where he must come to terms with reality – and finally does.

In 2012, another book by Korczak was translated into English. Kajtuś the Wizard (Kajtuś czarodziej) (1933) anticipated Harry Potter in depicting a schoolboy who gains magic powers, and it was very popular during the 1930s, both in Polish and in translation to several other languages. Kajtuś has, however, a far more difficult path than Harry Potter: he has no Hogwarts-type School of Magic where he could be taught by expert mages, but must learn to use and control his powers all by himself - and most importantly, to learn his limitations.

Korczak's The Persistent Boy was a biography of the French scientist Louis Pasteur, adapted for children - as stated in the preface - from a 685-page French biography that Korczak read. The book clearly aims to portray Pasteur as a role model for the child reader. A considerable part of the book is devoted to Pasteur's childhood and boyhood, and his relations with parents, teachers and schoolmates. It is emphasised that Pasteur, destined for world-wide fame, started from inauspicious beginnings - born to poor working-class parents in an obscure French provincial town and attending a far from high-quality school. There, he was far from a star pupil, his marks often falling below average. As repeatedly emphasised by Korczak, Pasteur's achievements, both in childhood and in later academic and scientific career, were mainly due to persistence (as hinted in the title), a relentless and eventually successful effort to overcome his limitations and early failures.

Pedagogical books
In his pedagogical works, Korczak shares much of his experience of dealing with difficult children. Korczak's ideas were further developed by many other pedagogues such as Simon Soloveychik and Erich Dauzenroth.

Thoughts on corporal punishment
Korczak spoke against corporal punishment of children at a time when such treatment was considered a parental entitlement or even duty. In The Child's Right to Respect (1929), he wrote,

List of selected works

Fiction
 Children of the Streets (Dzieci ulicy, Warsaw 1901)
 Fiddle-Faddle (Koszałki opałki, Warsaw 1905)
 Child of the Drawing Room (Dziecko salonu, Warsaw 1906, 2nd edition 1927) – partially autobiographical
 Mośki, Joski i Srule (Warsaw 1910)
 Józki, Jaśki i Franki (Warsaw 1911)
 Fame (Sława, Warsaw 1913, corrected 1935 and 1937)
 Bobo (Warsaw 1914)
 King Matt the First (Król Maciuś Pierwszy, Warsaw 1923) 
 King Matt on a Deserted Island (Król Maciuś na wyspie bezludnej, Warsaw 1923)
 Bankruptcy of Little Jack (Bankructwo małego Dżeka, Warsaw 1924)
 When I Am Little Again (Kiedy znów będę mały, Warsaw 1925)
 Senat szaleńców, humoreska ponura (Madmen's Senate, play premièred at the Ateneum Theatre in Warsaw, 1931)
 Kaytek the Wizard (Kajtuś czarodziej, Warsaw 1935)
 When We Had Wings: The Gripping Story of an Orphan in Janusz Korczak's Orphanage. A Historical Novel (Oegstgeest, 2023)

Pedagogical books
 Momenty wychowawcze (Warsaw, 1919, 2nd edition 1924)
 How to Love a Child (Jak kochać dziecko, Warsaw 1919, 2nd edition 1920 as Jak kochać dzieci)
 The Child's Right to Respect (Prawo dziecka do szacunku, Warsaw, 1929)
 Playful Pedagogy (Pedagogika żartobliwa, Warsaw, 1939)

Other books
 Diary (Pamiętnik, Warsaw, 1958)
 Fragmenty Utworów 
 The Stubborn Boy: The Life of Pasteur (Warsaw, 1935)

Remembrance 
Korczak is commemorated in a number of monuments and plaques in Poland, mainly in Warsaw. The best known of them is the cenotaph located at the Okopowa Street Jewish Cemetery, which serves as his symbolic grave. It is a monumental sculpture of Korczak leading his children to the trains. Created originally by Mieczysław Smorczewski in 1982, the monument was recast in bronze in 2002. The original was re-erected at the boarding school for children with special needs in Borzęciczki, which is named after Janusz Korczak.

However, the monument set up in the Świętokrzyski Park in 2006 is not only the largest but also, due to its very convenient location, the most frequently visited by school trips and tourists monument commemorating Korczak. Every year, around June 1, on Children's Day, trips from Warsaw schools go to the monument.

Due to decommunization policies, the Nikolay Bauman street in Kyiv, Ukraine was renamed after Korczak in 2016.

A minor planet, 2163 Korczak, is named after him.

Cultural references

In addition to theater, opera, TV, and film adaptations of his works, such as King Matt the First and Kaytek the Wizard, there have been a number of works about Korczak, inspired by him, or featuring him as a character.

Biographies and legacy 
 King of Children: The Life and Death of Janusz Korczak by Betty Jean Lifton (1989/2018), an acclaimed biography on the selfless life of Janusz Korczak from childhood and leading up to the Last March he would take with his orphans from the Warsaw Ghetto to the Treblinka-bound cattle cars.
 The influential twentieth-century Hebrew-language educator and publisher Zevi Scharfstein profiled Korczak in his 1964 work Great Hebrew Educators (גדולי חינוך בעמנו, Rubin Mass Publishers, Jerusalem, 1964).
 Loving Every Child: Wisdom for Parents edited by Sandra Joseph.

Fiction books 
 Milkweed by Jerry Spinelli (2003) – Doctor Korczak runs an orphanage in Warsaw where the main character often visits him
 Moshe en Reizele (Mosje and Reizele) by Karlijn Stoffels (2004) – Mosje is sent to live in Korczak's orphanage, where he falls in love with Reizele. Set in the period 1939-1942. Original Dutch, German translation available. No English version .
 Once by Morris Gleitzman (2005), partly inspired by Korczak, featuring a character modelled after him
 Kindling by Alberto Valis (Felici Editori, 2011), Italian thriller novel. The life of Korczak through the voice of a Warsaw ghetto's orphan. , no English translation.
 The Time Tunnel: Kingdom of the Children by Galila Ron-Feder Amit (2007) is an Israeli children's book in the Time Tunnel series that takes place in Korczak's orphanage.
 The Book of Aron by Jim Shepard (2015) is a fictional work that features Dr Korczak and his orphanage in the Warsaw Ghetto as main characters in the book.
 The Good Doctor of Warsaw by Elisabeth Gifford (2018), a novel based on a true story of a young couple who survived the Warsaw ghetto and of Dr Korczak and his orphanage.

Stage plays 
 Dr Korczak and the Children by Erwin Sylvanus (1957)
 Korczak's Children by Jeffrey Hatcher (2003)
 Dr Korczak's Example by David Greig (2001)
 The Children's Republic A play based on the life and work of Yanusz Korczak (2008) by Elena Khalitov, Harmony Theatre Company and School   
 The Children's Republic by Hannah Moscovitch (2009)
 Chlodnagaden nr. 33 By Rober Parr with music by Michael Ramløse, Teatret Fair play (Eng: The Fair Play Theater)
 Monsieur Fugue (1967) by Liliane Atlan is based in part on the story of Korczak

Film 
  (The Martyr), written by Ben Barzman and Alexander Ramati, directed by Aleksander Ford (1975)
 Korczak, written by Agnieszka Holland, directed by Andrzej Wajda (1990) portrayed by Wojciech Pszoniak
 Uprising (2001) directed by Jon Avnet, written by Avnet and Paul Brickman. Palle Granditsky portrayed Korczak.
The Courageous Heart of Irena Sendler (2009) directed by John Kent Harrison. Krzysztof Pieczynski played Dr. Janusz Korczak.
 The Zookeeper's Wife (2017), directed by Niki Caro. Arnošt Goldflam played Korczak.

Television 
 Studio 4: Dr Korczak and the Children - BBC adaptation of Sylvanus's play, written and directed by Rudolph Cartier (13 March 1962)

Music 
 Kaddish – long poem/song by Alexander Galich (1970)
 Facing the wall - Janusz Korczak – musical by Klaus-Peter Rex and Daniel Hoffmann (1997) presented by Music-theatre fuenf brote und zwei fische, Wülfrath
 Korczak's Orphans – opera, music by Adam Silverman, libretto by Susan Gubernat (2003)
 Korczak – musical by Nick Stimson and Chris Williams. Performed by the St Ives Youth Theatre at the Edinburgh Fringe Festival in 2005 and by Youth Music Theatre UK at the Rose Theatre, Kingston in August 2011
 King Mattias I - opera, music by Viggo Edén, from writings by Korczak, given World Premiere at Höör's Summer Opera (Sweden) on 9 August 2012.
 The Little Review from album Where the Darkness Goes, Awna Teixeira, 2012
 Janusz - piece for piano, music by Nicola Gelo (2013)

See also
 List of Holocaust diarists
 List of diarists
 List of posthumous publications of Holocaust victims

References

Further reading
 
 
 Joseph, Sandra (1999). A Voice for the Child: The inspirational words of Janusz Korczak. Collins Publishers.
 Lifton, Betty Jean (1988). The King of Children: The Life and Death of Janusz Korczak Collins Publishers.
 Mortkowicz-Olczakowa, Hanna (1961). Bunt wspomnień. Państwowy Instytut Wydawniczy.
 Parenting Advice from a Polish Holocaust Hero from National Public Radio
 Lawrence Kohlberg (1981). The Philosophy of Moral Development: Education for Justice pp. 401–408. Harper & Row, Publishers, San Francisco.
Mark Celinscak (2009). "A Procession of Shadows: Examining Warsaw Ghetto Testimony." New School Psychology Bulletin. Volume 6, Number 2: 38-50.

External links

 Janusz Korczak Living Heritage Association
 Ojemba Productions presents 'KORCZAK' at the Edinburgh Fringe Festival 2005!
 Korczak's Orphans opera  by Adam Silverman and Susan Gubernat
 I'm small, but important, German Documentary by Walther Petri and Konrad Weiss
 Wiersz Kazimierza Dąbrowskiego "Wątek X - Janusz Korczak" Heksis 1/2010
Janusz Korczak at culture.pl
Janusz Korczak at poezja.org (polish)
2012 - The Year of Janusz Korczak
 Catalog of Historic Medals Commemorating Janusz Korczak

1878 births
1942 deaths
Writers from Warsaw
Jewish agnostics
Jewish Polish writers
Jewish physicians
Polish agnostics
Polish Jews who died in the Holocaust
Polish educational theorists
Polish humanitarians
Polish murder victims
Polish medical writers
Polish pediatricians
Polish people of World War II
Polish children's writers
Recipients of the Order of Polonia Restituta
Warsaw Ghetto inmates
Polish people who died in Treblinka extermination camp
Golden Laurel of the Polish Academy of Literature
Holocaust diarists
Polish male novelists
Physicians from Warsaw
20th-century pseudonymous writers
Flying University alumni